Jardênia Félix Barbosa da Silva (born 9 September 2003), commonly known as Jardênia Félix, is a Brazilian Paralympic athlete who competes in T20 events. She is a silver medalist at the World Para Athletics Junior Championships, a two-time INAS Global Games bronze medalist and a Paralympic bronze medalist.

Early life
Jardênia Félix Barbosa da Silva was born in Natal, Rio Grande do Norte on 9 September 2003. In 2016, she began competing in able-bodied athletics and the following year, she switched to para-athletics after her coach identified some signs of intellectual disability.

Career
At the 2019 World Para Athletics Junior Championships, Félix won the silver medal at the 400m event. Two months later, at the 2019 INAS Global Games, she won a bronze medal in the 100m and 200m events.

At the age of 17, Félix won a bronze medal at the 2020 Summer Paralympics in the 400 metres event, recording her best time of 57:43. She also competed in the long jump, finishing in fifth place.

References

2003 births
Living people
People from Natal, Rio Grande do Norte
Brazilian female sprinters
Brazilian female long jumpers
Paralympic athletes of Brazil
Athletes (track and field) at the 2020 Summer Paralympics
Medalists at the 2020 Summer Paralympics
Paralympic medalists in athletics (track and field)
Paralympic bronze medalists for Brazil
Competitors in athletics with intellectual disability
Intellectual Disability category Paralympic competitors
Sportspeople from Rio Grande do Norte
21st-century Brazilian women